Keijiella is a genus of spiders in the family Theridiidae. It was first described in 2016 by Yoshida. , it contains only one species, Keijiella oculiprominens, found in "China, Taiwan, Laos, Korea, Japan".

References

Theridiidae
Monotypic Araneomorphae genera
Spiders of Asia